Coll de Banyuls is a mountain pass (and a border crossing) between France and Spain in the Albera Massif, the easternmost prolongation of the Pyrenees, helping to connect the Spanish municipality of Rabós (Alt Empordà, Catalonia) with the French commune of Banyuls-sur-Mer (Pyrénées-Orientales, Occitania). Its saddle point stands at about 357 metres above mean sea level. The pass was blocked with large rocks by the French government on 11 January 2021 and was kept closed under the pretext of "curbing irregular immigration and the terrorist threat".

A grassroots organization vowing to open the (closed) border crossings reopened it on 20 January 2023 by using an excavator.

See also 
 France–Spain border

References 

Mountain passes of Catalonia
Mountain passes of Occitania (administrative region)
France–Spain border crossings